Santiago Biglieri (born 11 February 1986 in Posadas, Misiones) is an Argentine football striker who plays for CA Colón. His nickname "Saviolita" refers to his physical similarity with Javier Saviola.

In 2007, he was part of the Lanús squad that won the Apertura 2007 tournament, the club's first ever top flight league title.

He was transferred in January 2010 on a one-year loan with an option to buy to Emelec of Ecuador.

Titles

External links
 Player profile on the Lanús website
 Argentine Primera statistics
 Santiago Biglieri, nueva incorporación de Colón, sol915.com.ar, 12 January 2016

1986 births
Living people
People from Posadas, Misiones
Argentine footballers
Argentine expatriate footballers
Association football forwards
Club Atlético Lanús footballers
C.S. Emelec footballers
Rosario Central footballers
Club Atlético Colón footballers
Sud América players
Portland Timbers 2 players
Expatriate footballers in Ecuador
Argentine expatriate sportspeople in Ecuador
Expatriate footballers in Uruguay
Argentine expatriate sportspeople in Uruguay
Argentine Primera División players
Primera Nacional players
Uruguayan Primera División players
USL Championship players
Ecuadorian Serie A players
Sportspeople from Misiones Province